Lunch, Recess & Detention is the sixth major release by the band Marcy Playground. It was released for digital download on June 26, 2012, the physical CD was also released in Canada on this date. Physical release of the CD in the United States was July 17, 2012.

The first single from the album was "Mr. Fisher".

Track listing

Personnel
John Wozniak - all vocals, guitar
Dylan Keefe - bass
Shlomi Lavie - drums

References

External links

2012 albums
Marcy Playground albums